Alessio Piemontese, also known under his Latinized name of Alexius Pedemontanus, was the pseudonym of a 16th-century Italian physician, alchemist, and author of the immensely popular book, The Secrets of Alexis of Piedmont. His book was published in more than a hundred editions and was still being reprinted in the 1790s. The work was translated into Latin, German, English, Spanish, French, and Polish.  The work unleashed a torrent of 'books of secrets' that continued to be published down through the eighteenth century.

Piemontese was the prototypical 'professor of secrets'. His description of his hunt for secrets in the preface to the Secreti helped to give rise to a legend of the wandering empiric who dedicated his life to the search for natural and technological secrets. The book contributed to the emergence of the concept of science as a hunt for the secrets of nature, which pervaded experimental science during the period of the Scientific Revolution.

It is generally assumed that Alessio Piemontese was a pseudonym of Girolamo Ruscelli (Viterbo 1500 — Venice 1566), humanist and cartographer.  In a later work, Ruscelli reported that the Secreti contained the experimental results of an 'Academy of Secrets' that he and a group of humanists and noblemen founded in Naples in the 1540s.  Ruscelli's academy is the first recorded example of an experimental scientific society.  The academy was later imitated by Giambattista Della Porta, who founded an ‘Accademia dei Secreti’ in Naples in the 1560s.

Works

 De' secreti del reuerendo donno Alessio Piemontese, Venice, 1555 (Italian)
--- 1562 edition

--- Les secrets de reverend Alexis Piémontois, Anvers,  1557 (French)

--- The Secretes of the Reverende Maister Alexis of Piermont, 1558 (English, translated from the French version)

--- Kunstbuch Des Wolerfarnen Herren Alexii Pedemontani/ von mancherleyen nutzlichen unnd bewerten Secreten oder Künsten, 1616 (German)

References

External links

 Girolamo Ruscelli's map of the North Atlantic.
 "Alessio Piemontese", The Biographical Dictionary of the Society for the Diffusion of Useful Knowledge, p. 842, Longman, Brown, Green , and Longmans , 1842
Les secrets dv seignevr Alexis Piemontois... From the Katherine Golden Bitting Collection in the Rare Book and Special Collection Division at the Library of Congress
 French Digital edition of The Secrets of Alexis of Piedmont (1557) by the University and State Library Düsseldorf

1566 deaths
16th-century Italian physicians
16th-century Italian cartographers
Year of birth unknown